This is a list of football transfers in the January (summer) transfer window in the 2010–11 season of the Argentine Primera División.

Clubs are ordered according to their final standing in the 2010 Apertura tournament. Only expatriate clubs are identified with national flags.

Estudiantes de La Plata

In:

Out:

Vélez Sarsfield

In:

Out:

Arsenal de Sarandí

In:

Out:

River Plate

In:

Out:

Godoy Cruz

In:

Out:

Racing

In:

Out:

Lanús

In:

Out:

All Boys

In:

Out:

Newell's Old Boys

In:

Out:

Colón

In:

Out:

Tigre

In:

Out:

Boca Juniors

In:

Out:

Argentinos Juniors

In:

Out:

San Lorenzo

In:

Out:

Banfield

In:

Out:

Quilmes

In:

Out:

Olimpo

In:

Out:

Huracán

In:

Out:

Gimnasia (LP)

In:

Out:

Independiente

In:

Out:

References
Closing '11 - Transfers at Argentine Soccer (February 18, 2020)

Transfers
Football transfers winter 2010–11
2011